The Bangkok Marathon (also known as BDMS Bangkok Marathon for sponsorship reasons) is a marathon held annually in Bangkok, Thailand, since 1987. The marathon is recognized by the Association of International Marathons and Distance Races (AIMS).

History 

In 1987, a marathon was held over the Rama IX Bridge in honor of the king's 60th birthday.  Called the Royal Marathon, it helped launch a running boom in Thailand.

In 2013, the course of the half marathon was changed at the last minute because of concurrent Bangkok street protests which reduced the distance of the half marathon from 21.1 km (13.1 miles) to 19.7 km (12.2 miles).

The 2020-2021 edition of the race was postponed to 2021 due to the coronavirus pandemic, before registration opened.

Course 
The course passes many historical landmarks of cultural and ethnic importance. The marathon starts and finishes in front of The Royal Grand Palace at Sanam Chai Road. The race course is sanctioned by The Association of International Marathons and Distance Races (AIMS) and the Amateur Athletic Association of Thailand (IAAF Rules).

Other races 
Along with full and half marathons, 10 km and 5 km races were also held.

Winners 

Key: Course record (in bold)

Notes

References

Sport in Bangkok
2015 in Thailand